Registry of Toxic Effects of Chemical Substances (RTECS) is a database of toxicity information compiled from the open scientific literature without reference to the validity or usefulness of the studies reported. Until 2001 it was maintained by US National Institute for Occupational Safety and Health (NIOSH) as a freely available publication.  It is now maintained by the private company BIOVIA or from several value-added resellers and is available only for a fee or by subscription.

Contents 
Six types of toxicity data are included in the file:

 Primary irritation
 Mutagenic effects
 Reproductive effects
 Tumorigenic effects
 Acute toxicity
 Other multiple dose toxicity

For all data the bibliographic source is listed. The studies are not evaluated in any way.

History 
RTECS was an activity mandated by the US Congress, established by Section 20(a)(6) of the Occupational Safety and Health Act of 1970 (PL 91-596). The original edition, known as the Toxic Substances List was published on June 28, 1971, and included toxicological data for approximately 5,000 chemicals. The name changed later to its current name Registry of Toxic Effects of Chemical Substances. In January 2001 the database contained 152,970 chemicals. In December 2001 RTECS was transferred from NIOSH to the private company Elsevier MDL. Symyx acquired MDL from Elsevier in 2007 and the Toxicity database was included in the acquisition. The Toxicity database is only accessible for charge on an annual subscription base.

RTECS is available in English, French and Spanish language versions, offered by the Canadian Centre for Occupational Health and Safety. The database subscription is offered on the Web, on CD-ROM and as an Intranet format.  The database is also available online from NISC (National Information Services Corporation, RightAnswer.com, and ToxPlanet (Timberlake Ventures, Inc)).

References

External links 

 RTECS overview
 Accelrys website 
 RightAnswer Website
 ToxPlanet Website

Chemical safety
Chemical databases
Toxic effects of substances chiefly nonmedicinal as to source